Ballobar may refer to:
 Ballobar, Huesca
 Lord of Ballobar, House of Argavieso